Ulrik Fredrik Johannes Patz (born 3 July 1993 in Skellefteå) is a Swedish curler.

He is a 2014 European mixed curling champion and a two-time Swedish mixed curling champion (2014, 2017).

Teams

Men's

Mixed

Mixed doubles

Personal life
Johannes Patz from well known Swedish family of curlers, which includes his father Flemming (who is also a coach, his aunt (Flemming's sister) Susanne, and his uncle (Flemming's brother) Rickard Hallström (also a coach).

References

External links

Living people
1993 births
People from Skellefteå Municipality
Swedish male curlers
European curling champions
Swedish curling champions
Universiade medalists in curling
Universiade silver medalists for Sweden
Competitors at the 2015 Winter Universiade
Competitors at the 2017 Winter Universiade
21st-century Swedish people